Kevin J. Brown (born 11 May 1974) is a British former professional ice hockey player.

Biography
Brown was born in Birmingham, England, and raised in Mississauga, Ontario. As a youth, he played in the 1988 Quebec International Pee-Wee Hockey Tournament with the Toronto Marlboros minor ice hockey team.

Career statistics

Awards
1993 - OHL Second All-Star Team
1994 - OHL First All-Star Team
1994 - Canadian Major Junior Second All-Star Team

Transactions
20 March 1996 - Los Angeles trades Brown to Ottawa for Jaroslav Modry and an eighth round pick in the 1996 NHL Entry Draft
1 July 1996 - Ottawa trades Brown to Anaheim for Mike Maneluk
1 October 1996 - Anaheim trades Brown to Hartford for the rights to Espen Knutsen
14 August 1998 - Brown transferred to Carolina after Hartford franchise relocated
14 August 1998 - Brown signs with Edmonton as a free agent
23 March 1999 - Edmonton trades Brown to New York for Vladimir Vorobiev
7 March 2000 - Brown signs with Edmonton as a free agent
10 September 2000 - Brown signs with Manchester Storm as a free agent

See also
List of National Hockey League players born in the United Kingdom

References

External links

1974 births
Living people
Anchorage Aces players
Augusta Lynx players
Beast of New Haven players
Belleville Bulls players
Canadian ice hockey right wingers
Canadian expatriate ice hockey players in England
Carolina Hurricanes players
Detroit Junior Red Wings players
Edmonton Oilers players
English emigrants to Canada
English ice hockey players
Florida Everblades players
Hamilton Bulldogs (AHL) players
Hartford Whalers players
Hartford Wolf Pack players
Ice hockey people from Ontario
Los Angeles Kings draft picks
Los Angeles Kings players
Manchester Storm (1995–2002) players
Phoenix Mustangs players
Phoenix Roadrunners (IHL) players
Prince Edward Island Senators players
Sportspeople from Birmingham, West Midlands
Sportspeople from Mississauga
Springfield Falcons players